NGC 6104 is a barred spiral galaxy located in the constellation Corona Borealis. It is designated as S(R)Pec in the galaxy morphological classification scheme, though it is clearly a barred spiral (deserving of the SB(R)Pec designation), and was discovered by William Herschel on 16 May 1787. The galaxy is approximately 388 million light-years away.

See also 
 List of NGC objects (6001–7000)
 List of NGC objects

References

External links 
 

Barred spiral galaxies
Corona Borealis
6104
57684
10309